Superoxidants are a class of reducing chemicals with an oxidizing power of +1.1 V or greater. For example, hexabrominated phenylcarbazole is a recently developed chemical with an oxidizing power of 1.35 V.

See also
 Bolskar, R. D.; Mathur, R. S.; Reed, C. A. J. Am. Chem. Soc. 1996, 118, 13093
 Chem. & Eng. News May 4, 1998, p 49-54
 Science 2000, 289, 101.

Oxidizing agents